Mano Po 2: My Home is a 2003 Filipino drama film directed by Erik Matti and the second installment of the Mano Po film series, followed by Mano Po (2002). It stars Susan Roces in the leading role. It was also the first Mano Po film that was not directed by Joel Lamangan. It was one of the official entries to the 2003 Metro Manila Film Festival and garnered five awards.

Plot
On a rainy night, Antonio Chan (Christopher de Leon) is killed in his car during a random mugging. In his lifetime, Antonio sired children with three different women: Sol (Kris Aquino and Susan Roces), the first wife, and non-Chinese; LuShui (Zsa Zsa Padilla), Chinese wife that was arranged to Antonio; and Belinda Ke (Lorna Tolentino), the concubine who is of Filipino-Chinese descent. His death and funeral arrangements divide his children whose parents had had strained relations with each other, particularly between Sol and LuShui on one side and Belinda on the other. After Belinda's son, Erickson, allows his elder half-brother Lean to lead the funeral honors, she and her half-brother, Johnson (Jay Manalo), hatch a plan to pin the blame on Sol, making it appear that Antonio's death was not random but premeditated by her. 

Sol is arrested on murder charges, but Belinda's daughter Grace, who is sympathetic to her other relatives, investigates and finds out that the charges were trumped up and that Lean had been recognized by Antonio as his heir and left him an inheritance as an act of penance before his death. Johnson is arrested while Belinda escapes by denying involvement, but at the cost of his son Erickson, who commits suicide in front of her as a result of her domineering ways and the stress of the previous events. Sol and LuShui comfort and forgive a distraught Belinda, who is reconciled with them.

Cast
Kris Aquino and Susan Roces as Sol Parco-Chan (past and present)
Christopher de Leon as Antonio Chan
Lorna Tolentino as Belinda Keh
Zsa Zsa Padilla as LuShui Chou
Judy Ann Santos as Grace Parco Chan
Carmina Villaroel as Janet Chan-Cua
Jay Manalo as Johnson Keh-Cua
Cogie Domingo as Lean Parco Chan
Richard Gutierrez as Erickson Keh-Chan
Alessandra De Rossi as Ingrid Keh-Chan
Karylle as Rose Chou Chan
Chynna Ortaleza as Yna
Angel Locsin as Melissa Ching
Zoren Legaspi as Rodrigo
Efren Reyes Jr. as Madiang
Crispin Pineda as Fidel
Raquel Villavicencio as Atty. Chiongbian 
Orestes Ojeda as Pio Andres
Val Victa as Atty. Lester Que

Production
While Susan Roces was the original choice to play the first wife, the Filipina Sol, the role of the third wife was mired in controversy. The contested role, the Chinese mestiza Belinda, was originally offered to Dina Bonnevie. However, Lolit Solis, manager to both Christopher de Leon and Lorna Tolentino, threatened to pull out her talents if the role was not given to Tolentino. The role was ultimately given to Tolentino; Bonnevie, who would have played the role of the second wife, the Chinese immigrant LuShui, bowed out of the production citing that she would not fit the role of a pure Chinese character. Zsa Zsa Padilla replaced Bonnevie in the film.

Awards

Legacy
A famous line of Lu Shui (Zsa Zsa Padilla), "Ako, legal wife!", inspired the fourth Mano Po installment, Ako Legal Wife, which, like Mano Po 2, revolves around concubinage (albeit in a more comedic tone) and also stars Padilla as Chona. Jay Manalo also starred in the film as her husband Elton.

See also
Mano Po (Filipino film series)
Mano Po
Mano Po III: My Love
Ako Legal Wife
Mano Po 5: Gua Ai Di
Bahay Kubo: A Pinoy Mano Po!
Mano Po 6: A Mother's Love
Mano Po 7: Tsinoy

References

External links
 

2003 films
2003 romantic drama films
Philippine romantic drama films
Regal Entertainment films
Films directed by Erik Matti